Tom Scott was a Scottish international rugby union player. He played as a Forward.

Rugby Union career

Amateur career

He played for Hawick.

Provincial career

Scott played for the South of Scotland in 1898.

International career

He was capped 12 times for Scotland from 1893 to 1900.

References

1870 births
1930 deaths
Hawick RFC players
Rugby union players from Melrose, Scottish Borders
Scotland international rugby union players
Scottish rugby union players
South of Scotland District (rugby union) players
Rugby union forwards